Garbiñe Muguruza was the defending champion heading into the tournament but chose to compete at the Sydney tennis event instead of Hobart. In the final, it was unseeded Brit Heather Watson who defeated the American qualifier in Madison Brengle, 6–3, 6–4 to record her second WTA title.

Seeds

Draw

Finals

Top half

Bottom half

Qualifying

Seeds

Qualifiers

Lucky loser
  Sílvia Soler Espinosa

Draw

First qualifier

Second qualifier

Third qualifier

Fourth qualifier

References
 Main Draw
 Qualifying Draw

Hobart International
2015 Hobart International